Shawn Budd (born 2 March 1974 in Sydney, Australia), is a professional snooker and pool player that has won major snooker and pool tournaments in Australia, New Zealand, England and America. He is the only Australian snooker player ever to win the Australian Open Snooker, Australian National Snooker, Australian 9 Ball and 8 Ball titles. Also he has won the Oceania Snooker championships and was runner up in the Oceania Billiards Championship in the same year. In 2002 he was a quarter finalist in the IBSF World Billiards Championships (50 up). In 1994 he won the Valley National Open 8-ball tournament in Las Vegas (over 5000 entries) and in 2001 he won the Masters 8-ball event. The event is now called the World Pool Championships.

Life 

Budd grew up in the Sydney suburb of Coogee. His grandfather, from Liverpool, England, first taught Shawn how to play snooker.

He attended Marcellin College Randwick.

Budd's cousin is actor/director Michael Budd.

Career

Early career

2-time Australian under-18 snooker champion
1994 Asian Pacific under-21 snooker champion – televised on the ABC
1994 Valley National Open 8 ball champion Las Vegas – over 5000 entries from 50 countries

Turned professional in 1992.

1995/1999

1996 Bribie Island Open Champion
1997,98,99 Australia National snooker champion
1997 World Speed Pool Champion (Las Vegas)
1997 World Target Pool Champion (Las Vegas) 
1997 IBSF World Championship Last 32
1997 Rooty Hills Masters Champion (3 consecutives centuries in final)
1998 IBSF World Championship Last 16
1998 WPBSA Oceania Qualifying Winner
1998 Princes Cup Winner
1999 Australian 8 ball champion held at Crown Casino
1999 Australian 9 ball Champion
1999 IBSF World Championship Last 16
1999 Central Coast Leagues Champion
1999 Fred Osbourne Albury Championship Runner Up
Winner of the 1999 $100,000 8 ball Challenge – The largest prize money tournament ever held in Australia

2000/2005

2000,2002,2004 Australian Open Snooker Champion
2001 VNEA 8-ball Masters Champion Las Vegas
2004 R/up Australian National Snooker Championships

2006/2016

2006 NSW state 8 ball Champion
2007 R/Up Central Coast – Beaten by world number 1 Neil Robertson
2007 Semi finalist Australian 9 ball
2007 The first ever Australian Open Scotch Doubles Champions – Stuart Lawler and Shawn Budd- nominated to represent Australian in Rotterdam, September 2007
2007 Runner up Australian National snooker championships
2008–2009 Fred Osbourne Albury Championship winner
2009 South Pacific Snooker Champion
2009 Australian Open Snooker Champion 
2010 Oceania Men's Snooker Championship 
2012 South Pacific Snooker Champion 
2012 Australian Open Snooker Champion 
2013 NSW 9 Ball Champion
2013 Australian Open 8 Ball Champion
2016 Lance Pannell Snooker winner
2016 Australian 10 Ball Champion 
2016 Oceania 9 Ball Champion

References

External links
 Official website
 Profile at BSANSW
 Herald Sun: Shawn Budd takes prize for sportsmanship

Australian snooker players
Australian pool players
Sportspeople from Sydney
1974 births
Living people